This article lists the main modern pentathlon events and their results for 2006.

International modern pentathlon events
 May 24 – 30: 2006 CISM Modern Pentathlon Championships in  Kaunas
 Individual winners:  Nikolay Yaskov (m) /  Victoria Tereshchuk (f)
 July 15 – 30: 2006 Central American and Caribbean Games in  Cartagena
 Individual winners:  Óscar Soto (m) /  Andrea Avena (f)

World modern pentathlon events
 August 7 – 13: 2006 World Junior Modern Pentathlon Championships in  Shanghai
 Junior Individual winners:  David Svoboda (m) /  Aya Medany (f)
 August 21 – 26: 2006 World Youth "A" Modern Pentathlon Championships in  Popoli
 Youth Individual winners:  Ondřej Polívka (m) /  Aya Medany (f)
 November 15 – 22: 2006 World Modern Pentathlon Championships in  Guatemala City
 Individual winners:  Edvinas Krungolcas (m) /  Marta Dziadura (f)

Continental modern pentathlon events
 April 17 – 24: 2006 European Junior Modern Pentathlon Championships in  Torres Vedras
 Junior Individual winners:  Dmytro Kirpulyanskyy (m) /  Anastasiya Prokopenko (f)
 June 30 – July 2: 2006 Pan American (NORCECA) Modern Pentathlon Championships in  Mexico City
 Individual Results #1:  Eli Bremer (m) /  Monica Pinette (f)
 Individual Results #2:  Andrei Gheorghe (m) /  Naciely Anton (f)
 July 6 – 9: 2006 European Youth "B" Modern Pentathlon Championships in  Prague
 Youth Individual winners:  Remigiusz Golis (m) /  Joanna Gomolinska (f)
 July 13 – 18: 2006 European Modern Pentathlon Championships in  Budapest
 Individual winners:  Gábor Balogh (m) /  Zsuzsanna Vörös (f)
 July 26 – 30: 2006 European Youth "A" Modern Pentathlon Championships in  Łódź
 Youth Individual winners:  Michal Kacer (m) /  Janine Kohlmann (f)
 October 6 – 8: 2006 South American Modern Pentathlon Championships in  Resende
 Individual winners:  Daniel Santos (m) /  Yane Marques (f)
 November 7 – 11: 2006 Asian Senior & Junior Modern Pentathlon Championships in  Kaohsiung
 Individual winners:  LEE Sung-hyun (m) /  Yun Cho-rong (f)
 Women's Junior Individual winner:  Yun Cho-rong

2006 Modern Pentathlon World Cup
 March 2 – 5: MPWC #1 in  Acapulco
 Individual winners:  Viktor Horváth (m) /  Claudia Corsini (f)
 April 6 – 9: MPWC #2 in  Millfield
 Individual winners:  Dzmitry Meliakh (m) /  Aya Medany (f)
 April 20 – 23: MPWC #3 for Men in  Berlin
 Winner:  Alexei Velikodnyi
 May 11 – 14: MPWC #3 for Women in  Moscow
 Winner:  Lucie Grolichová
 May 11 – 14: MPWC #4 for Men in  Budapest
 Winner:  Edvinas Krungolcas
 June 3 & 4: MPWC #4 for Women in  Székesfehérvár
 Winner:  Victoria Tereshchuk
 September 10 – 12: MPWC #5 in  Cairo
 Individual winners:  Cao Zhongrong (m) /  Aya Medany (f)
 September 19 – 24: MPWC #6 in  Chianciano Terme
 Individual winners:  Andrey Moiseyev (m) /  Paulina Boenisz (f)
 September 27 & 28: MPWC #7 (final) in  Chianciano Terme
 Individual winners:  Libor Capalini (m) /  Alessia Pieretti (f)

References

External links
 Union Internationale de Pentathlon Moderne Website (UIPM)

 
Modern pentathlon
2006 in sports